Molarband is a census town in the South East Delhi district of Delhi, India.

Demographics
 India census, Molarband had a population of 39,267. Males constitute 56% of the population and females 44%. Molarband had an average literacy rate of 68%, higher than the national average of 59.5%: male literacy was 77% and female literacy was 58%. 18% of the population was under 6 years of age.

References

Cities and towns in South Delhi district